Seif Asser Sherif (born 14 April 1995) is an Egyptian trampoline gymnast. He competed in the 2020 Summer Olympics after winning the African Championships.

References

1995 births
Living people
Sportspeople from Giza
Gymnasts at the 2020 Summer Olympics
Egyptian trampolinists
Olympic gymnasts of Egypt